"Valenti" is a song by South Korean singer BoA, for her second Japanese studio album of the same name (2003). It was released by Avex Trax as her sixth Japanese single on August 28, 2002, and features "Realize (Stay With Me)" as a B-side. A Korean version of "Valenti" was further promoted off of her compilation album Miracle, which was made available on September 24 by SM Entertainment.

Commercially, the single experienced success in Japan; it peaked at number two on the weekly Oricon Singles Chart and became her first top-three entry. It has sold over 202,000 physical copies in the country, making it to-date her best-selling single. It was certified gold by the Recording Industry Association of Japan (RIAJ) for both physical shipments and digital downloads.

Background and release 
"Valenti" was released on August 28, 2002 as BoA's sixth Japanese single via Avex Trax. It is musically a dance-pop number; according to South China Morning Posts Lucy Jeong, the song is "rooted in Latin music with a funky and mesmerizing sound." The release includes the B-side "Realize (Stay With Me)", as well as an English and instrumental version. A Korean version of the song was also recorded and was included in her special compilation album Miracle, which was made available on September 24, 2002, through SM Entertainment. The single "Valenti" serves as the title track for her second Japanese studio album of the same name, released on January 29, 2003.

Commercial performance
"Valenti" was a commercial success in Japan. The single peaked at number two on both the daily and weekly Oricon Singles Chart, making it her highest charting-single at the time, and would go on to become her highest-selling single in the country with over 202,000 physical copies sold. The physical single was certified gold by the Recording Industry Association of Japan (RIAJ) in September 2002 for shipments of over 200,000 units. On the year-end Oricon Singles Chart, "Valenti" was ranked the 65th best-selling single in the country during 2002. In December 2016, the digital version was certified gold for having surpassed 100,000 units in digital downloads.

Promotion
Following the release of Miracle, BoA performed the song on several South Korean music programs. On November 10, 2002, she received a music program award on SBS's Inkigayo. At her first Kōhaku Uta Gassen appearance on New Year's Eve of that year, BoA made a performance with the song. On March 27, 2003, BoA embarked on her 1st Live Tour: 2003  – Valenti, which spanned six shows in Osaka, Nagoya, and Tokyo. On May 17, BoA performed the song along with "No. 1" at the Dream Concert in Seoul.

Track listing
Japanese CD single
 "Valenti" – 4:19
 "Realize (Stay With Me)" – 4:17
 "Valenti" (English Version) – 4:18
 "Valenti" (Instrumental) – 4:19

Korean version [Miracle]
 "Valenti" – 4:19

Charts

Weekly and daily charts

Year-end charts

Sales and certifications

References

2002 singles
BoA songs
2002 songs
Avex Trax singles
Dance-pop songs
Songs with lyrics by Chinfa Kan